British Journalism Review is an opinionated quarterly journal covering the field of journalism. The journal's editor is Kim Fletcher who is supported by an editorial board of journalists and journalism academics. It was established in 1989 and is currently published by SAGE Publications on behalf of BJR Publishing.

Abstracting and indexing 
British Journalism Review is abstracted and indexed in:
 Academic Premier
 ComIndex
 Current Contents/Social and Behavioral Sciences
 MasterFILE Premier
 MLA International Bibliography
 Social Sciences Citation Index
 Zetoc

See also
 History of journalism in the United Kingdom

External links 
 

SAGE Publishing academic journals
English-language journals
Journalism journals
Publications established in 1989
Quarterly journals